Sebastian John "Sibby" Nichols (August 10, 1884 – January 20, 1957) was a Canadian professional ice hockey player who played 110 games in various amateur and professional leagues, including the Eastern Canada Amateur Hockey Association and Pacific Coast Hockey Association. Amongst the teams he played with were the Montreal Shamrocks, Vancouver Millionaires, Victoria Aristocrats, Spokane Canaries, and Seattle Metropolitans. He also played lacrosse with the Vancouver Lacrosse Club.

Biography

Nichols started out playing hockey in Montreal, Quebec where he represented the Montreal Shamrocks, Montreal Light Heat Power, and Montreal Astor-Canadien in different leagues. In the 1910–11 season he also played for the Moncton Victorias of the IPPHL and Belleville of the EOPHL, before moving out west to Vancouver and the Vancouver Millionaires in the PCHA for the 1912 season.

Nichols played for the Vancouver Millionaires from 1912 to 1916, though in the 1914–15 season when the Millionaires won its only Stanley Cup he was with the military and stationed in Asia on the ship RMS Empress of Russia at the outbreak of World War I. Back in the league for the 1915–16 season Nichols played one game with the Millionaires before moving on to the Victoria Aristocrats.

The Aristocrats were transferred to Spokane, Washington for the 1916–17 PCHA season and played there for one year as the Spokane Canaries, with Nichols tallying 10 goals. In March 1917 Nichols entered the Canadian Over-Seas Expeditionary Forces and did not play for two seasons before making a brief comeback in the 1919–20 season with the Seattle Metropolitans, appearing in the 1920 Stanley Cup Finals.

Nichols was born in Alexandria in the township of North Glengarry, Ontario in 1884, and he died in Los Angeles in 1957.

Statistics
CAHL-I = Canadian Amateur Hockey League-Intermediate, MMfHL = Montreal Manufacturers Hockey League, MCSHL = Montreal City Senior Hockey LeagueIPPHL = Inter-Provincial Professional Hockey League, EOPHL = Eastern Ontario Professional Hockey League, Exhb. = Exhibition games

Statistics from Society of International Hockey Research at sihrhockey.org

References

Sibby Nichols at Just Sports Stats
Sebastian John Nichols at Glengarry Sports Hall of Fame

Notes

1884 births
1957 deaths
Canadian ice hockey left wingers
Canadian lacrosse players
Ice hockey people from Ontario
Montreal Shamrocks players
Seattle Metropolitans players
Spokane Canaries players
Vancouver Millionaires players
Victoria Aristocrats players